Manuel "Man" Parrish (born May 6, 1958) is an American songwriter, vocalist and producer. He, along with artists such as Yellow Magic Orchestra, Kraftwerk, Art of Noise, Arthur Baker, Afrika Bambaataa, John Robie, Jellybean Benitez, Lotti Golden, Richard Scher and Aldo Marin, helped create and define electro in the early 1980s.

Early life
Parrish was born and raised in Brooklyn, New York. He left home at the age of 14 and became a member of the crowd that converged nightly at the Studio 54 nightclub in Manhattan. The nickname "Man" was given to Parrish by Andy Warhol, and first appeared in Warhol's Interview magazine.

Career

Parrish's early live shows at Bronx hip-hop clubs were spectacles of lights, glitter, and pyrotechnics, which drew as much from the Warhol mystique as the Cold Crush Brothers.

His first release was "Hip Hop, Be Bop (Don't Stop)" issued in 1982, which Parrish said faced a racial backlash from the African-American hip hop community: "I was making the music that they played, and then they found out I was white and gay they pulled it. It didn't hurt sales but it was shocking." The song was feature in the film Shaun of the Dead, the video game Grand Theft Auto: Vice City which sold millions of copies. It was sampled in Sway & King Tech's 1991 song "Follow 4 Now", from their second album, Concrete Jungle. His biggest chart success in the UK was his recording of "Male Stripper" with Man 2 Man, which peaked at No. 4 in the UK Singles Chart.

He eventually signed with Elektra Records via David Bowie's manager Tony DeFries who also managed his music career, but was dropped from the label in 1984, when they decided not to release the album he had recorded for them. Elektra signed him for dance music, his manager wanted him to create pop-rock.

He has mixed, produced and worked with various artists such as Boy George, Michael Jackson and Gloria Gaynor. He later served as the road manager for the Village People.

In 2010s, Parrish was in negotiations with Pink Biscuit Records and was scheduled to release a record via Southern Fried Records, the label owned by Fatboy Slim. Parrish started his own label instead.

From 2000 to 2015, he created the longest running underground New York City club party, at the CockBar.

In 2018, three pieces of his musical works were accepted into the Museum of Modern Art's MoMA permanent collection in New York City. Film scores for Behive, (a modern dance film), The Jones's, (an indie art film) and his 1983 music video for "Hip Hop, Be Bop (Don't Stop)".

In 2018, he also did a sound performance – installation for MoMA PS1 titled The Box, asking the question: Is Sound Considered Art?

Personal life
Parrish is gay. He lives in Port St. Lucie, Florida.

Discography

Albums
 Man Parrish (Importe/12 Records, 1982)
 Boogie Down (Rams Horn Records, 1985)
 The Best of Man Parrish (Rams Horn Records, 1991)
 Dreamtime (Hot Records, 1996)
 Star (Parrish Digital, 2017)

Singles

References

External links
 Official Site
 
 
 The Gay Roots of Hiphop

Living people
Elektra Records artists
Polydor Records artists
American electronic musicians
American dance musicians
Club DJs
Remixers
American electro musicians
American LGBT musicians
American people of Italian descent
1958 births